Grazhdan (romanized: Griásdani) is a small village in the former commune of Livadhe, Vlorë County, southern Albania. At the 2015 local government reform it became part of the municipality of Finiq. It is inhabited solely by Greeks.

Demographics 
According to Ottoman statistics, the village had 117 inhabitants in 1895. In the "Ethnographical map of Northern Epirus" which was written while Northern Epirus was autonomous (1914), the village had a population of 260, all ethnically Greeks.

Notable individuals 
Nikolaos Stavrou (1935 - 2011) (el), Greek American author and professor at Howard University.

References

External links 
Video showing the village

Villages in Vlorë County
Greek communities in Albania